Darb-e Hanz (also known as Darb-e Ḩamz and Dar Ḩamz) is a village in Jolgeh Rural District, in the Central District of Behabad County, Yazd Province, Iran. At the 2006 census, its population was 100, in 23 families.

References 

Populated places in Behabad County